Carbonic anhydrase 6 is an enzyme that in humans is encoded by the CA6 gene.  It is also called 'gustin' because of its presence in saliva, and lower-than-normal levels of salivary zinc in individuals with hypogeusia.

Function 

The protein encoded by this gene is one of several isozymes of carbonic anhydrase. This protein is abundantly found in salivary glands and saliva and protein may play a role in the reversible hydratation of carbon dioxide, though its function in saliva is unknown.

It has been suggested that CA VI participates in the maintenance of appropriate pH homeostasis on tooth surfaces as well as in the mucosa of the gastrointestinal canal.

References

Further reading